Adrian L. Spain is a United States Air Force major general serving as the chief of staff of the United States European Command since July 2022. He has commanded the 380th Air Expeditionary Wing from 2018 to 2019.

References

Year of birth missing (living people)
Living people
Place of birth missing (living people)
United States Air Force generals